Élizabeth Larouche is a Canadian former politician, who was elected to the National Assembly of Quebec in the 2012 provincial election. She was defeated by Guy Bourgeois of the Quebec Liberal Party in the 2014 election. She represented the electoral district of Abitibi-Est as a member of the Parti Québécois caucus.

References

Living people
Parti Québécois MNAs
Francophone Quebec people
Women MNAs in Quebec
People from Val-d'Or
21st-century Canadian politicians
21st-century Canadian women politicians
Year of birth missing (living people)